= KITAP =

KITAP is a non-governmental organization (NGO), a Tatar and Turkic association based in Prague, Czech Republic. The word kitap in Turkic language means a book (which was derived from Arabic) which symbolizes the culture and traditions of each Turkic nation as a new book to explore. The organisation was founded in 2013.

== Mission and goal ==
The mission of KITAP is to spread the unity of nations by bringing the richness of culture, cuisine and traditions together. The current goal of KITAP is to show Turkic culture, to promote it and to inform people about the traditions and identity of Turkic nations by organizing cultural and informative events.

== Activities ==
The first event of KITAP was held in the House of National Minorities, with 150 attendants in November 2013. The program of the event was dedicated to the Tatar culture. During the event participants performed Tatar songs, dances and presented the national clothes and cuisine of Tatar nation.

In 2015, KITAP organized a bigger event by participation of different Turkic nations as Azerbaijani, Kazakh, Kyrgyz, Turkish and Tatar. The number of spectators were about 400. Among the guests were the ambassador of Turkey, Ahmet Necati Bigali. The event was held in the Russian Center of Culture and Science.

On March 21, 2015, KITAP organized another event dedicated to Nowruz which is annually celebrated by Turkic nations.

Later in 2015, KITAP participated in 2015 in the international multinational festival named "Prague is the heart of nations" and presented the music of Tatar nation.
